The Provincial Highways of Khyber Pakthunkhwa consists of all public highways maintained by the Pakistani province of Khyber Pakhtunkhwa. All provincial highways in Khyber Pakthunkhwa are pre-fixed with the letter 'S' followed by the unique numerical designation of the specific highway (with a hyphen in the middle), i.e. S-1, S-2, S-3, etc. These are not to be confused with national highways which are federal roads maintained by the Government of Pakistan and the National Highway Authority.

List of provincial highways

List of provincial controlled-access highways

See also
 Motorways of Pakistan
 National Highways of Pakistan
 Transport in Pakistan
 National Highway Authority

References

External links 
 Pakhtunkhwa Highway Authority

Roads in Khyber Pakhtunkhwa
Highways in Khyber Pakhtunkhwa
Lists of roads in Pakistan